Located in Kaiserslautern Germany, Kaiserslautern Town Hall (Das Rathaus) is one of the tallest town halls in the European Union. The building was put in service in 1968. Kaiserslautern City Hall has 25 stories above ground, of which the three uppermost ones are only used as storage room or for operational devices. The building is 84 meters tall and has four elevators. It is the tallest building in Kaiserslautern and on the 21st floor is a restaurant and public observation deck.

History 

The design by the architect Roland Ostertag from Leonberg emerged as the winner in an architectural competition for the town hall on Paradeplatz in Mannheim in 1960 , but only the foundations were completed due to financial difficulties (see Mannheim town house ). With small changes, this design was then realized in Kaiserslautern. After financial difficulties were over, The City Hall was built and finished from 1964 to 1968. The City Hall also sits right next to a palace ruins occupied by Emperor Barbarossa.

Features 

The building has a plaza with a bronze-steel sculpture called "Balance." Also near the plaza are the ruins of Emperor Barbarossa's castle. Local skateboarders are seen near the plaza during the late hours of the day. On the top floor there is a restaurant and bar named twenty-one. The restaurant offers panoramic views of the city as far as the Palatinate Forest. Also seen are many of the landmarks of the city, such as the Fritz-Walter-Stadium and the several massive cathedrals dotted around Downtown Kaiserslautern. Very near city hall also is the K-Town Mall. Near the building, all the city buses meet at the station near the town, unusual because most towns in Germany have their main bus station near their train station.

Twenty-One 

Das Rathaus includes a restaurant on the 21st floor of the building. It is a restaurant & bar which usually opens around 17:30 (5:30PM) and closes around 1:30 AM. With the restaurant also includes a observation deck (where people can also eat at as well). People have access to the restaurant by going down the stairs to the left from the main lobby and noticing a sign displaying the restaurant name, from there people can take an elevator to the 21st floor to the restaurant.

Main use 
The City Hall is where the Government of Kaiserslautern functions, they are tenants to most of the building (21st to the restaurant of the same name, 1st to the lobby, and 2 floors to the basement).

References

External links
 
 http://www.skyscraperpage.com/diagrams/?b19786

City and town halls in Germany
Buildings and structures in Kaiserslautern